The Savannah Rug Ratz were an indoor soccer team based in Savannah, Georgia that played in the EISL during both of the leagues seasons from 1997–1998. They played their home games in the Savannah Civic Center.

During their existence, the Rug Ratz played a total of 52 games under head coach Ian MacDonald, winning 13, one via shootout, and losing 39, two via shootout. They scored a total of 564 goals and allowed a total of 832 goals and notched 40 total points in standings out of a possible 156 points. (The EISL awarded 3 points for a win, 2 for a shootout win, 1 for a shootout loss, and 0 for a loss in regulation.)

The team had planned to return for 1999 before the league folded in December 1998.

History

1997 season
The Greater Savannah Sports Council worked with the Alaska-based ownership group to bring the Rug Ratz to Savannah. The Rug Ratz finished 6th overall in the seven-team league. They finished the season with a record of 7 wins and 17 losses, including 1 shootout win and 2 shootout losses, for a total of 22 points. The team's average attendance ranked sixth in the seven-team league.

1998 season
The Rug Ratz began the 1998 season with new owners and a new logo. Savannah Sand Gnats principal owner Ken Silver and local investors (as "Low Country Pro Indoor Soccer Club Inc.") purchased the team in February 1998, pledging higher budgets and better community outreach. The team's first home game was postponed after a late cleaning of the turf left it too wet for safe play at game time.

The Rug Ratz finished 7th overall in the seven-team league. They finished the season with a record of 6 wins and 22 losses for a total of 18 points. The Rug Ratz averaged 1,747 fans per game, worst in the EISL where the average league game saw 2,733 fans in attendance. Head coach Ian MacDonald left the team after the season.

Savannah Rug Ratz forward Shawn Beyer was named to the 1998 EISL All-League Second Team. Players receiving All-League Honorable Mentions included defenders Dan McManemy and Sean Scott plus midfielder Colin Buck.

References

External links
Savannah Rug Ratz at Soccer Times

Eastern Indoor Soccer League teams
Association football clubs established in 1997
Association football clubs disestablished in 1998
Defunct indoor soccer clubs in the United States
Soccer clubs in Georgia (U.S. state)
Sports in Savannah, Georgia
1997 establishments in Georgia (U.S. state)
1998 disestablishments in Georgia (U.S. state)